Various Māori traditions recount how their ancestors set out from their homeland in waka hourua, large twin-hulled ocean-going canoes (waka). Some of these traditions name a mythical homeland called Hawaiki.

Among these is the story of Kupe, who had eloped with Kuramarotini, the wife of Hoturapa, the owner of the great canoe Matahourua, whom Kupe had murdered. To escape punishment for the murder, Kupe and Kura fled in Matahourua and discovered a land he called Aotearoa ('land of the long-white-cloud').  He explored its coast and killed the sea monster Te Wheke-a-Muturangi, finally returning to his home to spread the news of his newly discovered land.

Other stories of various Māori tribes report migrations to escape famine, over-population, and warfare.  These were made in legendary canoes, the best known of which are Aotea, Te Arawa, Kurahaupō, Mātaatua, Tainui, Tākitimu,  and Tokomaru. Various traditions name numerous other canoes. Some, including the Āraiteuru, are well known; others including the Kirauta and the sacred Arahura and Mahangaatuamatua are little known. Rather than arriving in a single fleet, the journeys may have occurred over several centuries.

"Great fleet" hypothesis
Percy Smith believed that the Polynesian traditions may have been flawed in detail, but they preserved the threads of truth that could be recovered using a method already well established for Hawaiian traditions by Abraham Fornander (An Account of the Polynesian Race, 1878–1885). The method involved seeking out common elements of tradition from different sources and aligning these to genealogies to give a timeframe for the events. Fornander, Smith and others used the method to reconstruct the migrations of the Polynesians and traced them back to a supposed ancient homeland in India.
 
Smith used the Fornander method and combined disparate traditions from various parts of New Zealand and other parts of Polynesia, to derive the "Great Fleet" hypothesis. Through an examination of the genealogies of various tribes, he came up with a set of precise dates for the Great Fleet and the explorers that he and others posited as having paved the way for the fleet.

According to Te Ara: The Encyclopedia of New Zealand, "Smith's account went as follows. In 750 CE the Polynesian explorer Kupe discovered an uninhabited New Zealand. Then in 1000–1100 CE, the Polynesian explorers Toi and Whātonga visited New Zealand, and found it inhabited by a primitive, nomadic people known as the Moriori. Finally, in 1350 CE a 'great fleet' of seven canoes – Aotea, Kurahaupō, Mataatua, Tainui, Tokomaru, Te Arawa and Tākitimu – all departed from the Tahitian region at the same time, bringing the people now known as Māori to New Zealand. These were advanced, warlike, agricultural tribes who destroyed the Moriori."

The Great Fleet scenario won general acceptance, its adherents including the respected Māori ethnologist Te Rangi Hīroa (Sir Peter Buck), and it was taught in New Zealand schools. However, it was effectively demolished during the 1960s by the ethnologist David Simmons, who showed that it derived from an incomplete and indiscriminate study of Māori traditions, as recorded in the 19th century. Simmons also suggests that some of these "migrations" may actually have been journeys within New Zealand.

The historian Rāwiri Taonui, writing in 2005 for Te Ara – the Encyclopedia of New Zealand, accuses Smith of falsification: "The Great Fleet theory was the result of a collaboration between the 19th-century ethnologist S. Percy Smith and the Māori scholar Hoani Te Whatahoro Jury. Smith obtained details about places in Rarotonga and Tahiti during a visit in 1897, while Jury provided information about Māori canoes in New Zealand. Smith then 'cut and pasted' his material, combining several oral traditions into new ones. Their joint work was published in two books, in which Jury and Smith falsely attributed much of their information to two 19th-century tohunga, Moihi Te Mātorohanga and Nēpia Pōhūhū".

In addition, it is now understood that the Moriori are an isolated offshoot of Māori who settled the Chatham Islands around 1500 CE.

See also
List of Māori migration canoes
Polynesian navigation
Māori culture
Whakapapa

Notes

References
R. D. Craig, Dictionary of Polynesian Mythology (Greenwood Press: New York) 1989, 24–26.
A. Fornander, An Account of the Polynesian Race 3 volumes. (London: Kegan Paul), 1878–1885.
T. R. Hiroa (Sir Peter Buck), The Coming of the Maori. Second Edition. First Published 1949. Wellington: Whitcombe and Tombs) 1974.
K. R. Howe, 'Ideas about Māori origins', Te Ara – the Encyclopedia of New Zealand, updated 3-Apr-2006. 
G. Irwin, The Prehistoric Exploration and Colonisation of the Pacific. (Cambridge University Press: Cambridge) 1992.
D. R. Simmons, The Great New Zealand Myth: a study of the discovery and origin traditions of the Maori (Reed: Wellington) 1976.
S. P. Smith, History and Traditions of the Maoris of the W. Coast, North Island, New Zealand (New Plymouth: Polynesian Society) 1910.

R. Walter, R. Moeka'a, History and Traditions of Rarotonga by Te Ariki Tara 'Are, (Auckland: The Polynesian Society) 2000, viii.

 
Māori mythology
Māori history
Polynesian navigation
Exploration ships